Ilya Vitalyevich Berkovsky (born 15 March 2000) is a Russian football player. He plays as an attacking midfielder for FC Pari Nizhny Novgorod on loan from FC Lokomotiv Moscow.

Club career
He made his debut in the Russian Professional Football League for FC Irtysh Omsk on 14 May 2017 in a game against FC Zenit Irkutsk.  He made his Russian Football National League debut for FC Torpedo Moscow on 2 August 2020 in a game against FC Shinnik Yaroslavl.

On 18 December 2020, he signed a 3.5-year contract with Russian Premier League club FC Lokomotiv Moscow. On 15 February 2021, he moved on loan to FC Nizhny Novgorod until the end of the 2020–21 season. On 19 June 2021, the loan was renewed for the 2021–22 season. He made his Russian Premier League debut for Nizhny Novgorod on 7 August 2021 in a game against FC Spartak Moscow. On 30 October 2021, he scored his first RPL goal against the club who holds his rights, FC Lokomotiv Moscow. On 17 June 2022, Berkovsky returned to FC Pari Nizhny Novgorod (as FC Nizhny Novgorod has been renamed by then) on another season-long loan.

Career statistics

References

External links
 
 Profile by Russian Professional Football League
 Profile by Football National League

2000 births
Sportspeople from Omsk Oblast
Living people
Russian footballers
Association football midfielders
FC Irtysh Omsk players
FC Torpedo Moscow players
FC Lokomotiv Moscow players
FC Nizhny Novgorod (2015) players
Russian Premier League players
Russian First League players
Russian Second League players